The 2004 Australian Open was a Grand Slam tennis tournament held in Melbourne, Australia from 19 January to 1 February 2004.

Andre Agassi was unsuccessful in defending his 2003 title, being defeated in the semi-finals by Marat Safin. This ended a 26-match winning streak for Agassi at the Australian Open, having previously won in 2000, 2001 and 2003, missing 2002 through injury. Roger Federer won his first Australian Open title, defeating Safin in the final. Serena Williams was unable to defend her 2003 title after withdrawing from the tournament due to a left knee injury. Justine Henin-Hardenne defeated compatriot and rival Kim Clijsters in the final to win her only Australian Open title.

Seniors

Men's singles

 Roger Federer defeated  Marat Safin, 7–6(7–3), 6–4, 6–2
It was Federer's 1st title of the year, and his 12th overall. It was his 2nd career Grand Slam title, and his 1st Australian Open title.

Women's singles

 Justine Henin-Hardenne defeated  Kim Clijsters, 6–3, 4–6, 6–3
It was Henin-Hardenne's 2nd title of the year, and her 16th overall. It was her 3rd career Grand Slam title, and her 1st Australian Open title.

Men's doubles

 Michaël Llodra /  Fabrice Santoro defeated  Bob Bryan /  Mike Bryan, 7–6(7–4), 6–3
It was Llodra's 2nd career Grand Slam doubles title and his 2nd (consecutive) at the Australian Open.
It was Santoro's 2nd career Grand Slam doubles title and his 2nd (consecutive) at the Australian Open.

Women's doubles

 Virginia Ruano /  Paola Suárez defeated  Svetlana Kuznetsova /  Elena Likhovtseva, 6–4, 6–3

Mixed doubles

 Elena Bovina /  Nenad Zimonjić defeated  Martina Navratilova /  Leander Paes, 6–1, 7–6(7–3)
It was Bovina's 1st career Grand Slam mixed doubles title.
It was Zimonjić's 1st career Grand Slam mixed doubles title.

Juniors

Boys' singles

 Gaël Monfils defeated  Josselin Ouanna, 6–0, 6–3

Girls' singles

 Shahar Pe'er defeated  Nicole Vaidišová, 6–1, 6–4

Boys' doubles

 Scott Oudsema /  Brendan Evans defeated  David Galić /  David Jeflea, 6–1, 6–1

Girls' doubles

 Chan Yung-jan /  Sun Shengnan defeated  Veronika Chvojková /  Nicole Vaidišová, 7–5, 6–3

Wheelchair

Men's singles
 David Hall defeated  Robin Ammerlaan, 6–4, 7–5

Women's singles
 Esther Vergeer defeated  Daniela Di Toro, 4–6, 6–3, 6–1

Men's doubles
 Robin Ammerlaan /  Martin Legner defeated  Tadeusz Kruszelnicki /  Satoshi Saida, 6–3, 6–3

Women's doubles
 Maaike Smit /  Esther Vergeer defeated  Sonja Peters /  Sharon Walraven, 6–3, 7–6(3)

Notes

External links
Australian Open official website

 
 

 
2004 in Australian tennis
2004,Australian Open
January 2004 sports events in Australia
February 2004 sports events in Australia